My Room in the Trees is the ninth studio album by the Innocence Mission, released July 13, 2010 by Badman Recording Company.

The iTunes edition of the album contained an exclusive bonus track, "Greys and Blues". The song was a pre-order bonus track, meaning that it was only available to those who pre-ordered the entire album before July 13.

Background and production
Intended for release in spring 2009, the album was preceded by the EP Street Map in December 2008. The EP – released independently by the Innocence Mission via their own LAMP label – was intended to preview several tracks that would appear on their upcoming studio album. However, an update to their website in September 2009 revealed that after further recording, the next LP had "turned out to be a mostly new group of songs, with maybe one song from Street Map". In March 2010, it was announced that no songs on Street Map would appear on My Room in the Trees.

The song "I'd Follow If I Could" was released as a bonus track under the title "Shooting Star (Sketch)" on international editions of their previous studio album, We Walked in Song. "Rhode Island" is a new version of a song from 1996. The band performed it on their tour for the album Glow tour and on the radio show Acoustic Café in February 1996.  A demo of "Rhode Island" from 1997 was offered briefly at the band's web site as a free download in February 2003.  The new recording of "Rhode Island" has double-tracked harmonies.

"Rain (Setting Out in the Leaf Boat)" features the return of founding member Steve Brown on drums. Brown left the group in 1997 to pursue a career as a chef. Two tracks ("Mile-Marker" and "The Melendys Go Abroad") are instrumentals, a staple of Don Peris's solo work.

Track listing
All songs written and composed by Karen Peris, except where noted.

Personnel
 Karen Peris: Vocals, Guitars, Piano, Pump Organ, Melodica, Artwork
 Don Peris: Electric and Acoustic Guitars, Drums, Cello, Background Vocals
 Mike Bitts: Upright and Electric Bass
 Steve Brown: Drums on "Rain (Setting Out in the Leaf Boat)"
 Gina Di Carlo: Violin on "Rain (Setting Out in the Leaf Boat)"
 Carl Saff: Mastering

Charts

References

2010 albums
The Innocence Mission albums
Badman Recording Co. albums